Glycosylphosphatidylinositol phospholipase D (EC 3.1.4.50, GPI-PLD, glycoprotein phospholipase D, phosphatidylinositol phospholipase D, phosphatidylinositol-specific phospholipase D) is an enzyme with systematic name glycoprotein-phosphatidylinositol phosphatidohydrolase. This enzyme catalyses the following chemical reaction

 6-(α-D-glucosaminyl)-1-phosphatidyl-1D-myoinositol + H2O  6-(α-D-glucosaminyl)-1D-myo-inositol + 3-sn-phosphatidate

This enzyme cleaves proteins from the lipid part of the glycosylphosphatidylinositol (GPI) anchors.

See also 
 Phospholipase

References

External links 
 

EC 3.1.4